Skogerøytoppen is the highest mountain on the island of Skogerøya in Sør-Varanger Municipality in Troms og Finnmark county, Norway. Skogerøytoppen lies on the northern part of the island, overlooking the large Varangerfjorden.

References

Sør-Varanger
Mountains of Troms og Finnmark